Nicholas (died 1217), also known as Koli, was a thirteenth-century Bishop of the Isles.

References

13th-century Scottish Roman Catholic bishops
Bishops of the Isles